The 1874 Victorian football season was an Australian rules football competition played during the winter of 1874. The season consisted of matches between metropolitan and provincial football clubs in the colony of Victoria.

1874 premiership 
North Melbourne and St Kilda were newly elevated from junior ranks to senior ranks for this season.

Carlton, who were undefeated during the season, was considered the premier club, with Melbourne runners-up, mostly by virtue of Carlton winning all four matches it played against Melbourne during the year.

Melbourne was considered to have had a slightly better record against the remaining clubs, with Carlton having four draws against these clubs, but such was Carlton and Melbourne's dominance at the time that their matches against the other clubs had little influence on the premiership.

Carlton's record across all matches in 1874 was twelve wins and five draws from seventeen games; Melbourne's record was twelve wins, five losses and one draw from eighteen games.

Club senior records 
The below table is set of results for senior clubs during the 1874 season. The list shows the record across all matches, including those against senior, junior and intercolonial clubs.

The Australasian and The Leader newspapers indicated Albert-park was the third best club, with North Melbourne fourth best, and St Kilda fifth: although North Melbourne's win–loss record appears superior to Albert-park's, its easier fixture (namely, four of its 11 matches were against junior teams) was taken into account. 

Lists published in The Argus from 1889  and in the Football Record in 1912-1923 recorded St Kilda as the third-placed club in 1874, but contemporary sources dispute this.
 East Melbourne was the best performing junior club of the 1874 season, with a record of 9–5–3.
  was the best performing provincial team of the season. It was undefeated in provincial matches, and it held the newly established Western District Challenge Cup throughout the season, but lost three matches against metropolitan clubs. Some sources from 1874 place Geelong in fourth (across all matches) or fifth (only matches against senior clubs) out of six clubs.

External links 
 History of Australian rules football in Victoria (1853-1900)

References 

Australian rules football competition seasons
1874 in sports
1874 in Australian sport
Victoria